Carlos Sampayo (born 17 September 1943) is an Argentine writer best known for his work in comics, particularly in collaboration with artist José Muñoz.

Sampayo was born in Carmen de Patagones, but left Argentina in the early 1970s for political reasons, and stayed in Italy, France and settled in Spain.

He is also a poet and a literature and music (particularly Jazz) critic.

Partial bibliography

ALACK SINNER BOOKS

 Mémoires d'un Privé (1977)
 Viet Blues (1986)
 Rencontres (1984)
 Nicaragua (1988)
 Souvenirs d'un Privé (1999)
 La Fin d'un Voyage (1999)
 Histoires Privées (2000)
 L'Affaire USA (2006)

JOE'S BAR

 Le Bar à Joe (1981)
 Histoire Amicale du Bar à Joe (1987)
 Dans les Bars (2002)

OTHER MUÑOZ & SAMPAYO BOOKS

 Sophie (1981, Vertige Graphic)
 Sudor Sudaca (1986, Futuropolis). Republished under the title Automne et Printemps (1997)
 Jeu de Lumieres (1988, Albin Michel)
 L'Europe En Flammes (1990, Albin Michel)
 Billie Holiday (1991, Casterman)
 Le Cheval Sans Tête IV: Un héritage (1997, Amok Éditions)
 Le Poète (1999, Vertige Graphic)
 Le Livre (2004, Casterman)

OTHER COMIC BOOK TITLES

 L'Agent de la nationale (1982, Michel Deligne). Artists Julio Schiaffino, Jorge Zentner
 Evaristo (1985, Dargaud). Artist Francisco Solano López

NOVELS
 El lado salvaje de la vida (1991)
 El año que se escapó el león (2000)
 En panne Seiche (2002)

OTHER TITLES
 Paraguay, crónica de un exterminio (Treatise - 1978)
 Fragmentos (Poetry - 1998)
 Memorias de un ladrón de discos (1999)

External links
 Carlos Sampayo profile on Lambiek Comiclopedia
 |SSampayo%2C+Carlos%2C+1943-|Orightresult?lang=eng&suite=pearl Extensive list of Carlos Sampayo titles in the Michigan State University Comic Art Collection

1943 births
Living people
Argentine comics writers